The semiotic theory of Charles Sanders Peirce describes three distinct categories of signs: icons, indexes and symbols.

References
 Jonathan A. Smith, Horace Romano Harré, Luk Van Langenhove (eds.), Rethinking Psychology, Volume 1, SAGE, 1995, p. 114.

Semiotics
Theories of language
Symbols